The Assembly demoparty is a demoscene and gaming event in Finland. It is the biggest demoscene party. The main organizers of the event are Pekka Aakko (Pehu of Accession) and Jussi Laakkonen (Abyss of Future Crew). The Summer event takes place every year between late July and early August, and lasts three to four days, and the Winter event is held in January or February. Edition 2020 was online. The most recent Assembly was held from 1 to 3 April 2022 at Messukeskus in Helsinki.

Assembly Winter was announced in early 2007. The winter party is a more gaming-oriented LAN party–type event, whereas the summer events continues the traditions of the original demoparty under the name Assembly Summer. Both events are held once a year.

History 
The first Assembly was held from July 24 to July 26, 1992, in Kauniainen. It was organized by the Amiga demo groups Complex and Rebels, and the PC demo group Future Crew. The staff grew into a large non-profit group of individuals known as Assembly Organizing. Through the 1990s, Assembly grew so large that even exposition halls no longer sufficed, and only the largest of sports arenas met the partygoers' needs. In 1999, they rented the largest sports arena in the country, Hartwall Areena in Helsinki, with over 5000 visitors and 3500 computers on the ice rink.

The 2004 edition of the party also set a record: in July 2004, QuakeCon announced it was holding the world's first Doom 3 competitions on the event starting on August 12–14, roughly a week after the game's release on August 3. Assembly, however, managed to snatch the first place after acquiring copies of the game via FedEx with the help of some contacts in the United States and holding the competition during August 5–8.

In 2022, the party celebrated 30 years of continuous operation.

Boozembly

Since 1995, an event called Boozembly has been organized in a nearby forest. It is officially unrelated to Assembly but serves as a meeting point for Assembly attendees as well as for other computer hobbyists and their friends. In Boozembly it is possible to use intoxicants which is not allowed in Assembly. Later IT corporations started to sponsor free beer for Boozembly. Like Assembly, Boozembly itself has become an important part of Finnish demoscene culture.

Competitions 

The party includes multiple competitions, or compos including but not limited to:

 Demo
 Oldskool demo (older machines)
 64k intro (discontinued after 2011; reintroduced from 2017–2020)
 4k intro
 1k intro
 Dance music
 Listening music
 Fast Music
 Fast graphics
 Short film
 Real Wild demo
 Photo
 Video game developing compo

For the first eight years of Assembly, the demo and intro competitions were split into separate IBM PC compatible and Amiga categories. Starting in 2000, the platforms have been combined, with PC (Windows or Linux), Amiga, Mac and even high-end consoles competing in the same demo and intro competitions. Similarly, Commodore 64 competitions were replaced with "oldskool" competitions that also allow entries for some other old platforms, such as various 8-bit systems and older Amigas.

Entries are submitted by demogroups and individual artists and are rated by judges. All demos which are deemed to be of a high-enough standard are then shown on a big screen. Entries which break the competition rules (e.g. use copyrighted material, or aren't suitable for the category to which they are entered) are disqualified. People who are present at the arena vote for the entries, and the results are published on the Assembly website. The entries are usually made available by the artists at scene.org or on the artists own website.

Assembly's demo competitions generally hold a very high level, especially for a party that is not specific to the demoscene. Notable winners include Lifeforce by ASD, Panic Room by Fairlight and Frameranger by Fairlight, CNCD and Orange.

Janne "Tempest" Suni—who is a Finnish demoscener, pixel artist, tracker musician, and a member of the demogroup Fairlight—is best known for his song "Acidjazzed Evening". "Acidjazzed Evening" originally won the oldskool music competition at the 2000 Assembly demoparty. Suni and his award-winning song came to mainstream prominence after the melody was unlawfully co-opted by hip-hop producer Timbaland in the 2006 song "Do It" by Nelly Furtado.
During  Assembly demoparty 2013 an electronic music concert was performed on stage by Sabastian Teir alias „Kebu”.

Demo and intro competition winners

AssemblyTV
In recent years, Assembly has broadcast content from its in-house media effort AssemblyTV to local and national TV networks, as well as producing web streams for people to watch live over the internet — spots for hundreds, if not thousands of viewers are catered for, and these streams have been watched all over the world, not just in Finland. In addition to the opening and closing ceremonies, the competitions and party reports, the educational sessions that are being held during the party are broadcast via AssemblyTV.

ARTtech seminars
ARTtech seminars are free-to-attend educational seminar sessions that are being held during the party at the venue location. The sessions cover various subjects that are usually related to the main party theme and idea, including sessions about programming (coding), graphic design, music composition, game development, hardware hacks, scene history and more.

References

External links
 Assembly.org — Official website
 Assemblytv.net — Official media
 Assembly 2006 — MBnet The Official Ezine of Assembly 2006.
 Assembly on Pouët
 The ARTS Radio (MP3) contains an interview with the primary organizer of Assembly, Abyss of Future Crew.

Demo parties
LAN parties
Festivals in Helsinki
Recurring events established in 1992